Philonthus cognatus is a rove beetle. Adults are 8 to 10 mm long. They are mainly black in colour, although the elytra have a metallic sheen, and are profusely pitted. A distinctive feature of this species is that the underside of the first antennal segment is yellow, contrasting with the black upperside. It is a common species in Britain.

References

 

Staphylininae
Beetles of Europe
Beetles described in 1832